Atari: 80 Classic Games in One!, known as Atari Anthology on consoles, is a video game collection developed by Digital Eclipse and published by Atari Interactive. The title is a compilation of 80 video games previously published by Atari, Inc. and Atari Corporation, reproducing Atari's games from its arcade and Atari 2600 game console platforms. Many games permit one to play each title at varying speeds, with time limits, or with a shifting color palette.

Extra contents include original arcade artwork and scans of the instruction manuals for the Atari 2600 games, video interviews with Atari co-founder Nolan Bushnell, Windows desktop themes, DirectX 9 runtime, Adobe Reader 5.1 English version.

Support for Stelladaptor 2600 to USB interface, and 24-bit color wallpapers for Asteroids, Centipede, Missile Command, Pong, Super Breakout, and Tempest themes are available as patches.

Games

Atari arcade games

Asteroids
Asteroids Deluxe
Battlezone
Black Widow
Centipede
Crystal Castles
Gravitar
Liberator
Lunar Lander
Major Havoc
Millipede
Missile Command
Pong
Red Baron
Space Duel
Super Breakout
Tempest
Warlords

Atari 2600 games

3-D Tic-Tac-Toe
A Game of Concentration (PC only)
Adventure
Air-Sea Battle
Asteroids
Atari Video Cube  (Console only)
Backgammon (Console only)
BASIC Programming  (PC only)
Battlezone
Blackjack
Bowling
Breakout
Canyon Bomber
Casino
Centipede
Circus Atari
Codebreaker (PC only)
Combat
Crystal Castles
Demons to Diamonds
Desert Falcon
Dodge 'Em
Double Dunk
Flag Capture
Football
Fun With Numbers
Golf
Gravitar
 Hangman (Console only)
Haunted House
Home Run
Human Cannonball
Math Gran Prix
Maze Craze
Millipede
Miniature Golf
Missile Command
Night Driver
Off the Wall
Outlaw
Quadrun
Radar Lock
RealSports Baseball
RealSports Football
RealSports Tennis
RealSports Volleyball
Sky Diver
Slot Machine
Slot Racers
Space War
Sprintmaster
Star Raiders
Star Ship
Steeplechase
Stellar Track
Street Racer
Submarine Commander
Super Baseball
Super Breakout
Super Football
Surround
Swordquest: Earthworld
Swordquest: Fireworld
Swordquest: Waterworld
Video Checkers
Video Chess
Video Olympics
Video Pinball
Warlords
Yars' Revenge

Marketing
As part of Atari's 40th anniversary, free download of Atari: 80 Classic Games in One! was also available in the following General Mills boxed cereal products: Cinnamon Toast Crunch (17 oz.), Lucky Charms (16 oz.), Honey Nut Cheerios (17 oz.), Cheerios (18 oz.) and Cocoa Puffs (16.5 oz.).

A free Atari: 80 Classic Games in One! CD could also be found inside General Mills boxed cereals in Canada.

Atari Anthology includes the following changes:
The Windows desktop themes, DirectX 9 runtime, and Adobe Reader 5.1 English version have been removed.
The Atari 2600 titles Atari Video Cube, Backgammon, and Hangman have been added.
The Atari 2600 titles A Game of Concentration, BASIC Programming, and Codebreaker have been removed.
Unlockable game challenges, which add challenges by reaching predetermined goals in specific games.

Atari Classics Evolved
This compilation, published for PlayStation Portable in 2007, includes 11 arcade classics from Atari Anthology (such as Asteroids and Super Breakout) and also 50 Atari 2600 titles (that are unlockable). Also, every arcade title has an "evolved" version with new graphics and sounds. To unlock the 2600 games, the player must win all awards in all arcade titles.

Reception

The console versions of the game received "mixed or average" reviews, while the PC version received "generally favorable" reviews, according to according to review aggregator Metacritic.

References

External links

The 80 Classic Games
Atari Inc. Atari 80 Classic Games in One page
Digital Eclipse Software, Inc page
Digital Eclipse support page for Atari: The 80 Classic Games

Anthology
Digital Eclipse Software, Inc page: Playstation 2, Xbox
Atari page: Playstation 2, Xbox

2003 video games
PlayStation 2 games
Xbox games
Windows games
Atari video game compilations
Video games developed in the United States
RenderWare games
Digital Eclipse games
Multiplayer and single-player video games